The year 1528 in science and technology included a number of events, some of which are listed here.

Events
 Paracelsus leaves Basel.

Exploration
 February – Diego García de Moguer explores the Sierra de la Plata along the Río de la Plata and begins to travel up the Paraná River.
 November 6 – Spanish conquistador Álvar Núñez Cabeza de Vaca and his companions become the first Europeans known to set foot on the territory of Texas.
 Jean Fernel publishes Cosmotheoria, including a means of determining a degree of arc of the meridian.

Medicine
 May – The fourth major outbreak of the sweating sickness occurs in England, also spreading to northern Europe.

Births
 October 10 – Adam Lonicer, German botanist, naturalist and physician (died 1586)
 Adam von Bodenstein, Swiss alchemist and physician (died 1577)

Deaths
 April 6 – Albrecht Dürer, German artist and polymath (born 1471)
 Martín Fernández de Enciso, Spanish explorer (born c. 1470)
 Al-Birjandi, Persian astronomer and mathematician
 Giovanni da Verrazzano, Italian-born explorer (born 1485) (killed and eaten by Carib people)

References

 
16th century in science
1520s in science